Santosh is a place in Tangail, Dhaka Division, Bangladesh. Before the British reign, it was named as 'Khoshnodpur'. The place is popular for Mawlana Abdul Hamid Khan Bhasani, a great saint and famous scholar.

Mawlana Bhashani spent his last years of his life in Santosh. He established "Santosh Islamic University" there in 1974. Bhashani established many educational institutes and earning sources under the Islamic University including a primary school, girls and boys high school, college, soap industry, cotton industry. Mawlana Bhashani Science and Technology University was established in 1999 on the campus of Islamic University founded by Mawlana Bhashani. The Mazar Sharif of Mawlana Abdul Hamid Khan Bhashani (R) resides here.

Santosh Trophy 

This is one of important domestic football tournament held in India each year . Tournament is named after this place as by former association President Sir Manmatha Nath Roy Chowdhury.

References

Populated places in Dhaka Division
Populated places in Tangail District